The 9th London Trophy was a motor race, run to Formula One rules, held on 22 May 1961 at Crystal Palace Circuit. The race was run over 37 laps of the circuit, and was won by British driver Roy Salvadori  in a Cooper T53.

This race was run on the same day as the World Championship 1961 Dutch Grand Prix, but since entry to that event was by invitation only, many regular Formula One drivers were attracted to Crystal Palace.

Results

References
 "The Grand Prix Who's Who", Steve Small, 1995.
 "The Formula One Record Book", John Thompson, 1974.

London Trophy
Trophy
Motorsport in England
International sports competitions in London
London